Bakauli Kala is a village in the tehsil/mandal of Hainsar Bazar in the Sant Kabir Nagar district of Uttar Pradesh, India.

Demography
According to the 2011 India census, In BaKauli Kala Number of Households is 353 and had a population of 2282. Males constituted 1101 of the population, and females 1181 of the population .

Transportation
Bakauli kala is well connected to state highway 72. U.P State Buses are available for Delhi, Lucknow, Gorakhpur, Kanpur, and Allahabad.

Sarpanch
Punam Devi is the current sarpanch of Bakauli kala Panchayat.

External links
 Official facebook page at facebook

Villages in Sant Kabir Nagar district